Hypobleta is a genus of moths of the family Noctuidae described by Turner in 1908.

Species
 Hypobleta cymaea Turner, 1908
 Hypobleta fatua Viette, 1961
 Hypobleta festiva Viette, 1961
 Hypobleta viettei Berio, 1954

Lepidoptera and Some Other Life Forms gives this name as a synonym of Obana Walker, 1862.

References

Acontiinae